The 2015 Rugby Europe Women's Trophy was the second edition of the competition. It was held in Switzerland from October 29 to November 1, 2015. Belgium were crowned champions after defeating hosts, Switzerland, 50–20 in the final.

Results

Semi-finals

3rd Place

Final

References

2015
2015 rugby union tournaments for national teams
2015–16 in European women's rugby union
2015
Rugby union in Switzerland